Iosefo Verevou (born 5 January 1996) is a Fijian footballer who plays as a forward for Suva in the Fiji National Football League.

Early career
Verevou started playing football at an early age and was a star football player for his high school  team Saraswati College  in Nausori.

He came up through the Rewa FC youth system and made his first team debut at the age of 14. With this feat he became the youngest player to play for a semi-professional football team in Fiji.
After 7 years at Rewa, he seemed to move to Suva in January 2018 however at the end of January the move was cancelled for an unclear reason.

International career
Verevou was a member of Fiji's U-20 national team at the 2015 FIFA U-20 World Cup in New Zealand. During the tournament, he scored with a header in an 8-1 defeat to Germany and also scored a goal in a 3-0 victory over Honduras.

On 7 November 2015, he made his senior debut for the national team in their friendly match against Vanuatu.

On 16 July 2016, Verevou was named in Fiji's 18-man squad for the 2016 Summer Olympics in Rio de Janeiro.

Personal life
His elder brother, Epeli Saukuru, is also a footballer who represent Fiji.

Honours

Club
Rewa
Battle of the Giants tournament : 2015, 2017
Fiji Football Association Cup Tournament : 2017

Individual
FASANOC Sportsman of the Year : 2015

References

External links

1996 births
Living people
Fijian footballers
Rewa F.C. players
People from Rewa Province
Association football forwards
Fiji international footballers
2016 OFC Nations Cup players
Footballers at the 2016 Summer Olympics
Olympic footballers of Fiji